Slizovo is a rural locality (a village) in Churovskoye Rural Settlement, Sheksninsky District, Vologda Oblast, Russia. The population was 287 as of 2002.

Geography 
Slizovo is located 35 km east of Sheksna (the district's administrative centre) by road. Demsino is the nearest rural locality.

References 

Rural localities in Sheksninsky District